Kilimani is a mixed-use commercial and residential neighbourhood in the city of Nairobi.

Location
It is north of Woodley; east of Kileleshwa, mainly separated by the Kirichwa River; the larger Kilimani area encompasses the Hurlingham, Caledonia, Upper Hill, and the Kilimani estates.

Overview
The neighbourhood was established as a whites-only residential area by the British colonialists in the mid 20th century. It was not until the 1960s when it was racially integrated. The neighbourhood has historically been primarily low-density residential, but since 2000 has become increasingly high-density mixed residential and commercial; both retail and offices.

Points of interest
 Residencies
State House Nairobi, the official residence of the President of Kenya is located in Kilimani, on State House Road.

 Schools
(1) Kilimani Primary School, Milimani Primary School, St Hannah's School, St. Nicholas School, St Christophers School, Cavina School are all located in the neighborhood. (2) The Lycée Denis Diderot, the French international school, is in Kilimani. It moved there in 1972. (3) West Nairobi School, a Christian international school, opened in Kilimani in 1996 but moved to Karen in 2000. (4) State House Girls' School is located on the grounds of State House Nairobi. Svenska Skolan, the Swedish international school, is located in Kilimani.

 Banks
The headquarters of Sidian Bank are located on Wood Avenue in Kilimani.

 Shopping malls

Adam's Arcade is the oldest shopping centre of its kind in neighbouring Woodley, Nairobi, Kenya, as well as East and Central Africa as a whole. Established in 1954 and completed in 1959 by Abdul Habib Adam.
 
Yaya Centre, in Hurlingham, is a shopping mall with over 100 retail shops.

 Parks
The Nairobi Arboretum, featuring more than 300 exotic and indigenous tree species, is located in Kilimani, adjacent to State House.

See also

List of cities in Kenya

Notes

References 

Suburbs of Nairobi
Nairobi